Marthe Delpirou or Marthe Delpirou-Baron (1900–1945) was a lawyer and a French resistance fighter, member of Combat Zone Nord. 

Doctor of Laws, secretary of Elizabeth Dussauze, member of Ricou group, she was arrested on 28 June 1942 by the Geheime Feldpolizei. She died of exhaustion at Ravensbruck camp, where she had been sent at the end of her sentence. Her body was never found.

A street bears her name in the French town of Saint-Pierre-Quiberon.

References

1900 births
1945 deaths
20th-century French women lawyers
20th-century French lawyers
Resistance members who died in Nazi concentration camps
French people who died in Ravensbrück concentration camp
Female resistance members of World War II